Yu Shiran is a Paralympian athlete from China competing mainly in category T53 sprint events.

He competed in the 2008 Summer Paralympics in Beijing, China.  There he won a gold medal in the men's 200 metres - T53 event, a bronze medal in the men's 100 metres - T53 event and went out in the first round of the men's 400 metres - T53 event

External links
 

Paralympic athletes of China
Paralympic gold medalists for China
Paralympic bronze medalists for China
Chinese male sprinters
Year of birth missing (living people)
Living people
Medalists at the 2008 Summer Paralympics
Medalists at the 2012 Summer Paralympics
Athletes (track and field) at the 2008 Summer Paralympics
Athletes (track and field) at the 2012 Summer Paralympics
Paralympic medalists in athletics (track and field)